Krutets is a rural locality (a village) in Filippovskoye Rural Settlement, Kirzhachsky District, Vladimir Oblast, Russia. The population was 18 as of 2010. There are 5 streets.

Geography 
Krutets is located 28 km west of Kirzhach (the district's administrative centre) by road. Ryazantsy is the nearest rural locality.

References 

Rural localities in Kirzhachsky District